Trinidad "Trini" Alvarado (born January 10, 1967) is an American actress best known for her performances as Margaret "Meg" March in the 1994 film adaptation of Louisa May Alcott's novel Little Women and Lucy Lynskey in the comedy/horror film The Frighteners. She also has had notable stage performances and singing roles in musicals.

Personal life 

Alvarado was born in New York City, the daughter of Sylvia, a Puerto Rican flamenco dancer, and Domingo Alvarado, a Spanish-born flamenco singer.  As a child, she lived on upper Riverside Drive (Manhattan) on the Upper West Side.  She attended the Professional Children's School and studied at Fordham University. Alvarado said in a People magazine interview for the movie Stella: "I lead kind of a quiet life. I just grew up that way." Alvarado more or less stays out of the limelight and is a self-described homebody; she revealed during the promotion for The Frighteners, "It's just difficult to go away. I was very nervous about having to go to New Zealand for nearly seven months [to make The Frighteners]. I was very tragically saying goodbye to everybody."

She resides in New York City and is married to actor Robert McNeill.

Career 
Alvarado made her show business debut at the age of seven when she joined her family's dance troupe, and that led to roles on stage, including the role of Melinda in Elizabeth Swados's Broadway musical Runaways in 1978. Alvarado was featured, along with Karen Evans, on the song "Lullaby From Baby to Baby", denoted by Swados as the "theme song" of the musical. In 1977-78, she appeared in two Unicorn Tales television specials. The next year, she starred in Rich Kids alongside John Lithgow and Jeremy Levy, and she lent her vocals to the ending song "Happy Ida and Broken-Hearted John". The same year, she appeared in the ABC Afterschool Special "A Movie Star's Daughter" as Dena McKain, her first of two appearances in the series (her second was the 1981 special Starstruck).

In 1980, Alvarado appeared in Times Square with Tim Curry and Robin Johnson, in which she and Johnson sang together "Your Daughter Is One."

There followed roles in a string of TV shows and movies before she appeared in Gillian Armstrong's 1984 drama Mrs. Soffel. In 1985, Alvarado played the role of Anne Frank in the off-Broadway musical Yours, Anne. The following year, she starred as the title character in Maggie Magalita, another off-Broadway production.

Her next roles—the young Lisa Titus in the ill-fated 1987 film The Chair, the tough, smart-aleck May "Mooch" Stark in the frank, girl-dominant teen movie Satisfaction—led up to playing the daughter of Stella Claire (portrayed by Bette Midler), in another version of Stella. Midler and Alvarado bonded on set and performed an impromptu duet of the chorus of the Beatles' "If I Fell" during Alvarado's screen test, which led to Alvarado's being cast.

After Stella, Alvarado played the role of Elinor Hartley in American Friends, which Michael Palin both wrote and starred. Alvarado later worked alongside John Goodman on the 1992 biopic The Babe, playing the role of Helen Woodford Ruth.

Alvarado worked with director Gillian Armstrong on the 1994 film adaptation of Little Women. When asked about the role, she said "I am Hispanic and Meg...is not a Hispanic, but even so they gave me the part. But I understand the situation. I understand it because sometimes I see a film about Hispanics, where none of actors is Hispanic, and I feel bad about that. I'd feel particularly bad if they hadn't allowed me to audition, when they said that they'd already seen all the Hispanics in Hollywood, which isn't true." She and her cast mates endured lessons in Victorian life, including proper etiquette, and restricting dresses. About the women's limiting garb, Alvarado said, "It's so obvious why women were thought of as the weaker sex. I don't know if it was a subconscious desire of designers to hold women back, but you can't even take a full breath [in these dresses]."

Alvarado's next film was 1995's The Perez Family, co-starring Alfred Molina, Anjelica Huston and Marisa Tomei. The next year saw the release of The Frighteners, Peter Jackson's horror/comedy film about a con artist who sees ghosts, and The Christmas Tree, the directorial debut of actress Sally Field. Alvarado is better known for the first, but The Frighteners wasn't hugely popular during its initial release. In the making-of documentary included with the revamped DVD, Alvarado admitted to enduring bruises because of the active, violent scenes in the movie and to being "cursed"; an ice cream truck from a local New Zealand vendor would go by playing "Greensleeves" every time Jackson did a close-up on her and make her break character.

She appeared in the last minutes of Paulie (1998). Other major roles include a supporting part in the critically acclaimed film Little Children in 2006.

She played various roles on TV, appearing alongside Eric Stoltz in 2000's The Last Dance. She played the role of Samantha Loeb in the sci-fi drama Fringe, appearing in two episodes in 2008 and 2009. Alvarado had a role in the films All Good Things, which starred former co-star Kirsten Dunst, and The Good Guy, screened at the Tribeca Film Festival on 26 April 2009.

Alvarado has provided the voice-over for the audio books Trickster's Choice, Trickster's Queen and the series Alanna: Song of the Lioness Quartet, written by Tamora Pierce. Alvarado voiced Debbie Macomber's Changing Habits.

In May 2014, she appeared in the episode "Forget Me" of the series Black Box.

Filmography

See also 

List of Puerto Ricans

References

External links
 
 

1967 births
Actresses from New York City
20th-century American actresses
American child actresses
American actresses of Puerto Rican descent
American people of Spanish descent
American television actresses
Living people
People from Manhattan
Fordham University alumni
American film actresses
American female dancers
American dancers
21st-century American actresses
American stage actresses
American musical theatre actresses
Hispanic and Latino American dancers
Dancers from New York (state)